Hinkley Glacier is a glacier flowing northeastward from Corbet Peak and Schoening Peak, Vinson Massif on the east slope of Sentinel Range in the Ellsworth Mountains, Antarctica, and continuing between Mount Segers and Zinsmeister Ridge to enter Dater Glacier southeast of Nebeska Peak and northwest of Sipey Bluff. It was named by US-ACAN (2006) after Todd K. Hinkley, Technical Director, National Ice Core Laboratory, U.S. Geological Survey, Denver, CO,2001-06.

See also
 List of glaciers in the Antarctic
 Glaciology

Maps
 Vinson Massif.  Scale 1:250 000 topographic map.  Reston, Virginia: US Geological Survey, 1988.
 Antarctic Digital Database (ADD). Scale 1:250000 topographic map of Antarctica. Scientific Committee on Antarctic Research (SCAR). Since 1993, regularly updated.

References

External links
 Hinkley Glacier SCAR Composite Antarctic Gazetteer

Glaciers of Ellsworth Land